Tilden Middle School  may refer to:
 Tilden Middle School - Rockville, Maryland - Montgomery County Public Schools
 William T. Tilden Middle School - Philadelphia, Pennsylvania - School District of Philadelphia